Dark Shadows: Blood Dance is a Big Finish Productions original dramatic reading based on the long-running American horror soap opera series Dark Shadows.

Plot 
Chicago, 1929: Quentin Collins encounters a mysterious nightclub owner.

Cast
Quentin Collins – David Selby
Chandres Tessier – Lisa Richards

This play sees the return of original series actor Lisa Richards to the world of Dark Shadows after forty years.

External links
Dark Shadows - Blood Dance
"Blood Dance Recording Photos on David Selby's Official Website"
"Blood Dance on writer Stephen Mark Rainey's website"

References

Dark Shadows audio plays
2010 audio plays
Fiction set in 1929
Chicago in fiction